The Light Thief (Svet-Ake) is a 2010 Kyrgyz drama film directed by Aktan Arym Kubat. The film was Kyrgyzstan's submission for Best Foreign Language Film for the 83rd Academy Awards, but did not make the final shortlist.

Cast
 Aktan Arym Kubat as Svet-Ake 
 Taalaikan Abazova as Bermet
 Askat Sulaimanov as Bekzat
 Asan Amanov as Esen
 Stanbek Toichubaev as Mansur

Plot
Our main character Svet-Ake, or Mr. Light, is the local electrician in an extremely impoverished, underfunded Kyrgyz town. He tries his best to be the man of the people who, in a robin hood fashion, manipulates the electric meters for those who cannot afford to pay for their electricity. Even with this, he sees that more and more townspeople are leaving the town in search of better jobs, threatening the town's tradition and way of life.

Svet-Ake is a humble and humorous man, however, this may be his undoing. When Bezkat, a businessman, comes to Svet-Ake's town, he promises to fund Svet-ake's windmills and modernize the valleys if he works for him. However,  Bezkat is corrupt and tries to manipulate the local government and becomes the mayor. Svet-Ake soon realizes that Bezkat's work is destroying the very land and tradition he so dearly wanted to protect.

Corruption in the Movie
Bekzat names Mansur the mayor without any voting at all. 
The windmills are tied up. If they were freed, everyone could have had electricity and the village would flourish 
Protests against the presidency with red flags. 
Political Opposition Silenced: when Svet was beaten as he tried to speak out against the corruption.

Reviews
“The Light Thief might be a simple story, but it's ultimately a complex film” –Montreal Gazette

“European funds contributing to the production and with a burning subject such as energy control high on the world’s priority list, this is a surefire festival item, with definite chances for niche art house distribution.” –Screen Daily

Awards
Locarno International Film Festival - Piazza Grande
Toronto International Film Festival - Contemporary World Cinema
Cannes Film Festival - Directors' Fortnight
Eurasia International Film Festival - FIPRESCI Prize

References

External links
Global Lens 2011 film THE WHITE MEADOWS - The Global Film Initiative
 
Film Review - The Guardian UK
Film Review - Variety
Film Review - Hollywood Reporter

2010 films
Kyrgyzstani drama films
Kyrgyz-language films